The KAL1 general purpose infantry rifle (KAL1 GPIR) was an Australian bullpup rifle designed in the 1970s for jungle warfare following complaints about the weight and length of the L1A1 SLR rifles then in service with the Australian Army. The design never entered service, with the bullpup configured, optically sighted 5.56 mm F-88 Austeyr selected instead in 1989.

See also
List of bullpup firearms
List of battle rifles

Notes

References

7.62×51mm NATO battle rifles
Bullpup rifles
Trial and research firearms of Australia